Dianra is a town in north-western Ivory Coast. It is a sub-prefecture of and the seat of Dianra Department in Béré Region, Woroba District. Dianra is also a commune.
In 2021, the population of the sub-prefecture of Dianra was 61,527.

Villages
The twenty four villages of the sub-prefecture of Dianra and their population in 2014 are:

Notes

Sub-prefectures of Béré Region
Communes of Béré Region